Nub or NUB may refer to:

Nub, an analog controller on Pandora and PlayStation Portable
ISO 639-2 code for the Nobiin language of Nubia
Northern University, Bangladesh
National University, Bangladesh
NUb, brand of Oliva Cigar Co.
National Union of Blastfurnacemen, Ore Miners, Coke Workers and Kindred Trades, former UK trades union
Nub, colloquialism for pointing stick on a laptop
Nahda University, Egypt

Entertainment
Vernon, Florida (film), a 1981 film originally titled Nub City
NUB, female bodyguard organisation in novel Nobody Lives for Ever
Nub, a song on Jesus Lizard's 1991 album Goat
Nub, guitarist from children's TV series Generation O!
Nub Kleinke (1911–1950), Major League Baseball player

See also
NUBS (disambiguation)